Matavera is a Cook Islands electoral division returning one member to the Cook Islands Parliament.

The electorate was created in 1981, when the Constitution Amendment (No. 9) Act 1980–1981 adjusted electorate boundaries and split the electorate of Takitumu into three. It consists of the tapere of Titama, Tupapa, Matavera, Pouara, and Vaenga on the island of Rarotonga.

Members of Parliament

References

Rarotonga
Cook Islands electorates